Frank Comstock (August 19, 1856 – October 6, 1914) was a one-term Republican mayor of South Norwalk, Connecticut in 1889. He was born in Wilton in 1856. He was the son of  John R. Comstock and Helen Eugenia Whitney. He served for three years as a Burgess of the Borough of Norwalk. Comstock served in the Connecticut House of Representatives in 1893.

In 1882, Comstock founded, along with Samuel Raymond, the Raymond & Comstock Company, a hat factory at 50 Day Street, in Norwalk.

References 

1856 births
Connecticut city council members
American milliners
Mayors of Norwalk, Connecticut
Republican Party members of the Connecticut House of Representatives
People from Wilton, Connecticut
1914 deaths
19th-century American politicians